What The… is the seventh studio album by American hardcore punk band Black Flag. The album was originally announced to be released on November 5, 2013, with 3 promotional singles being released between May and July. However, on November 5, What The… was only released through online streaming sources such as Spotify and Rdio, and a physical release date was pushed back to December 3, 2013. It is the band's first full-length studio album since In My Head (1985), marking the longest gap between two studio albums in their career, as well as being their first recording with vocalist Ron Reyes since Jealous Again (1980) and drummer Gregory "Drummer" Moore. This album also marked the first time since My War (1984) that guitarist Greg Ginn played bass on a Black Flag album under the name Dale Nixon. Three weeks after the album's release, Reyes was fired mid-show during a performance in Australia due to differences with Ginn. The band's manager and professional skateboarder Mike Vallely replaced Reyes on vocals.

Artwork
Unlike the cover art of the majority of Black Flag's catalog, What The… was not designed or illustrated by Raymond Pettibon. Instead, the cover art was designed by vocalist Ron Reyes. This change was very negatively received. Gregory Adams of Exclaim! described the cover as "gasp-inducing," and said that it looked like, "a South Park character giving us the devil horns after getting juiced off a bag of Fun Dip." Marah Eakin of The A.V. Club described it as "downright hideous," and said that it looked like a, "mashup of some slime green globs, the Warheads candy guy, and Rude Dog." Michael Roffman of Consequence of Sound described it as "cringeworthy," and said that it was, "either a funny nod to '90s bumper stickers, or a sign at how well of a relationship Ginn still has with his brother/former Black Flag artist Raymond Pettibon. Either way? Yikes."

Reception

What The... was poorly received by music critics. At Metacritic, which assigns a normalized rating out of 100 to reviews from mainstream critics, the album received an average score of 42, based on 10 reviews, which indicates "mixed or average reviews".

AllMusic gave the album a rating of two and a half stars out of five. The reviewer felt that vocalist Ron Reyes "was never one of Black Flag's better vocalists, and he hasn't improved much after more than 30 years" and that "this music seems clumsy and half-hearted, and Ginn's interplay with new drummer Gregory Amoore [sic] feels sluggish and leaden at every turn."

Track listing

Personnel
Black Flag
 Greg Ginn – composer, guitar, organ, theremin
 Gregory Moore – drums, backing vocals
 Dale Nixon – bass
 Ron Reyes – composer, lead vocals

Additional musicians
 Mathew Cortez – drums
 The Ducky Boys of Granger Lake – backing vocals
 Ron Raygunn – backing vocals
 Cliff Samuels – backing vocals
 Eric Vasquez – backing vocals

Production
 Andy Batwinas – engineer
 Mike Shear – engineer

References 

2013 albums
Black Flag (band) albums
SST Records albums